Dylewo may refer to the following places:
Dylewo, Golub-Dobrzyń County in Kuyavian-Pomeranian Voivodeship (north-central Poland)
Dylewo, Rypin County in Kuyavian-Pomeranian Voivodeship (north-central Poland)
Dylewo, Maków County in Masovian Voivodeship (east-central Poland)
Dylewo, Ostrołęka County in Masovian Voivodeship (east-central Poland)
Dylewo, Warmian-Masurian Voivodeship (north Poland)